Bellare is a village located in Sullia taluk of Dakshina Kannada district Karnataka state, India.

Notable personalities

Educational institutions
Govt primary school Bellare.
Govt Higher primary school.
Govt primary school Darkasthu.
Govt Secondary Education.
Govt Junior College.
Shivramkarant Degree College, located near Bellare at Pervaje.
Private Jnana ganga central school.
Hidaya Educational & Charitable Trust Bellare - Education - Sullia D K
Darul Huda Islamic complex
Darul Hikma Education Centre

Economic activities
Agriculture. The village has advanced agricultural developments in the field of plantation crops, consisting of areca nut (Mangalore chali), coconut, coco, vanilla, pepper, cashew nut and rubber.
Rubber processing factory
Meena Enterprises (wholesale Dealers for construction materials)
Kathyaini traders (wholesale grocery)

Health care 
 Govt primary health centre Bellare
 Dr. Shashidhar padil clinic
 Anupama clinic
 SM Bhat clinic
 Ganesh clinic

Climate
The average annual temperature is 34 °C. Summers are warm and humid, whereas during the monsoon season the village receives heavy rainfall, and cools by the year's end.

Culture and arts
Pilgrimage and worship places
 Ajipila Mahalingeshwara Temple
 Swami Lakshmi venkatramana Temple
 Pervaje Jaladurga Devi Temple
 Mutthu Mariyamma Temple Darkasthu
 ZAKARIYA JUMA  MASJID
  BELLARE valiyullahi DARGA SHARIF 
 Churches of Christian community
   ASR BELLARE TRUST  COMING SOON

References

Villages in Dakshina Kannada district